Rhodo is an unincorporated community in Cherokee County, in the U.S. state of North Carolina.

History
A post office called Rhodo was established in 1906, and remained in operation until 1916. According to tradition, the community's name is a corruption of "raw dough", a description of a local inn's biscuits.

References

Unincorporated communities in North Carolina
Unincorporated communities in Cherokee County, North Carolina